Burt Schuman (born 1948) is the first Polish postwar rabbi of Reform Judaism. Originally from New York, NY, Rabbi Schuman spent 11 years as the rabbi of Temple Beth Israel in Altoona, Pennsylvania.

References

External links
 Beit Warszawa

1948 births
American emigrants to Poland
American people of Polish-Jewish descent
American Reform rabbis
Living people
People from Altoona, Pennsylvania
People from Warsaw
Polish Reform rabbis
Rabbis from New York City
Rabbis from Warsaw
21st-century American Jews